The 24th Special Tactics Squadron is one of the Special Tactics units of the United States Air Force Special Operations Command (AFSOC). It is the U.S. Air Force component to Joint Special Operations Command (JSOC). It is garrisoned at Pope Field, North Carolina.

Mission
The 24th STS provides special operations airmen for the Joint Special Operations Command, including Pararescuemen, Combat Controllers, Special Reconnaissance,  and Tactical Air Control Party personnel. They are the Air Force's Tier 1 unit, and 24th STS members are mostly known for being enablers to the Army's 1st Special Forces Operational Detachment-Delta (a.k.a. Delta Force) and the Navy's Special Warfare Development Group, or DEVGRU (a.k.a. SEAL Team 6) due to their specific skill sets, but the 24th STS conducts operations on their own as well. 24th STS members are also trained in conducting classified and clandestine operations such as direct action, counter-terrorism, counter-insurgency, hostage rescue, and special reconnaissance.

History

World War II
The first predecessor of the squadron was activated at Hamilton Field, California in October 1941 to be the director unit for the 24th Pursuit Group, which was formed simultaneously at Clark Field, Philippines as the headquarters for pursuit squadrons of the Philippine Department Air Force.  After completing training, the squadron sailed on the USAT President Garfield on 6 December 1941.  However, due to the Japanese attacks on Pearl Harbor and Clark Field, the President Garfield returned to port on 10 December and the squadron returned to Hamilton Field.

Although nominally assigned to the 24th Group from January through October 1942, the squadron served with air defense forces on the Pacific coast until it was disbanded on 31 March 1944 when the Army Air Forces converted its units in the US from a rigid table of organization units to more flexible base units. Accordingly, its personnel and equipment were transferred to the 411th AAF Base Unit (Fighter Wing) at Berkeley, California.

Special operations
The 24th Special Tactics Squadron was initially called BRAND X from 1977 until Operation Eagle Claw in 1980, then after the founding of JSOC, Det 1 MACROS (Detachment One, Military Airlift Command Operations Staff), while in late 1985 (the Achille Lauro hijacking) it was Det 4 NAFCOS (Detachment Four, Numbered Air Force Combat Operations Staff), and in 1987 it became 1724th Combat Control Squadron, and then in the same year the 124th Special Tactics Squadron.  By the time of Operation Just Cause in mid-December 1989, it had the then-new name of 24th Special Tactics Squadron.

The 24th Special Tactics Squadron participated in the United States invasion of Panama in 1989. The 24th STS deployed 11 personnel including the unit commander, Lt. Col. Jim Oeser, as part of JSOC's Task Force Ranger during Operation Restore Hope in 1993. Due to their actions during the Battle of Mogadishu multiple decorations were awarded to the airmen. Pararescueman (PJ) TSgt Tim Wilkinson received the Air Force Cross and fellow PJ MSgt Scott Fales received the Silver Star, both for providing lifesaving medical care to wounded soldiers. Combat Controller (CCT) SSgt. Jeffrey W. Bray also received the Silver Star for coordinating helicopter attack runs throughout the night around their positions.

From 15 to 20 September 2000 the 24th STS with the 23rd Special Tactics Squadron took part in the annual Canadian military exercise, Search and Rescue Exercise (SAREX). This was the first time Special Tactics units took part in SAREX.

In recent years the squadron has been heavily involved in combat operations in Iraq and Afghanistan where the unit was part of the JSOC groupings Task Force 121, Task Force 6-26 and Task Force 145. In 2003 members of the unit were involved in two combat jumps in the initial phases of the Iraq War alongside the 3rd Ranger Battalion. The first combat jump was on 24 March 2003 near the Syrian border in the Iraqi town of Al Qaim where they secured a small desert landing strip to allow follow-on coalition forces into the area. The second combat jump was two days later near Haditha, Iraq, where they secured the Haditha Dam.

On 8 April 2003 Combat Controller Scott Sather, a member of the 24th STS, became the first airman killed in combat in Operation Iraqi Freedom near Tikrit, Iraq. He was attached to a small team from the Regimental Reconnaissance Company. The RRD team and Sather were operating alongside Delta Force, under Lieutenant Colonel Pete Blaber, west of Baghdad. They were tasked with deceiving the Iraqi army into believing the main U.S. invasion was coming from the west in order to prevent Saddam Hussein from escaping into Syria. Sather Air Base was named after him.

The 24th STS was a part of JSOC's Task Force 145 which was a provisional grouping specifically charged with hunting down high-value al-Qaeda and Iraqi leadership including Al-Qaeda in Iraq leader, Abu Musab al-Zarqawi, who was killed in June 2006.

The squadron lost three members – PJs John Brown and Daniel Zerbe and CCT Andrew Harvell – in 2011 when the Chinook in which they were flying was shot down in Afghanistan. To honor the three 24th STS members who died in the 2011 Chinook shootdown, 18 members of AFSOC marched 800 miles from Lackland Air Force Base, San Antonio Texas to Hurlburt Field, Florida in their memory.

Notable members

 PJ Tim Wilkinson received the Air Force Cross for his actions during the 1993 Battle of Mogadishu. Wilkinson was portrayed by Ty Burrell in the 2001 film Black Hawk Down which chronicled the events of the Battle of Mogadishu.
 CCT John Chapman was posthumously awarded the Air Force Cross, later upgraded to the Medal of Honor. He is the first US Air Force member to receive the Medal of Honor since the Vietnam Era, for his actions in the Battle of Takur Ghar during the War in Afghanistan. In 2005 a U.S. Navy Buffalo Soldier-class container ship was renamed the TSgt John A. Chapman in Chapman's honor.
 PJ Ramon Colon-Lopez, the current Senior Enlisted Advisor to the Chairman of the Joint Chiefs of Staff, was a member of the 24th STS twice. From February 1999 – January 2005 Colon-Lopez was a Special Tactics Element Leader and April 2009 – April 2011 he was the Squadron's Senior Enlisted Advisor. In 2007 Colon-Lopez was one of the first six recipients of the newly created Air Force Combat Action Medal. He was awarded the AFCAM for a 2004 operation in Afghanistan during which he led an Advance Force Operations Team.

Lineage
 24th Fighter Control Squadron
 Constituted as the 24th Air Corps Interceptor Control Squadron on 14 October 1941
 Activated on 21 October 1941
 Redesignated 24th Fighter Control Squadron on 15 May 1942
 Disbanded on 31 March 1944

 24th Special Tactics Squadron
 Designated as the 1724th Combat Control Squadron on 1 May 1987
 Redesignated 1724th Special Tactics Squadron on 1 October 1987
 Reconstituted and consolidated with the 1724th Special Tactics Squadron on 1 March 1992
 Consolidated with the 24th Fighter Control Squadron on 1 March 1992
 Redesignated 24th Special Tactics Squadron on 31 March 1992

Assignments
 Fourth Air Force, 21 October 1941
 24th Pursuit Group, 15 January 1942 (apparently attached to Fourth Air Force until 7 July 1942, then to IV Fighter Command)
 San Francisco Air Defense Wing (later San Francisco Fighter Wing), 15 October 1942 – 31 March 1944
 Twenty-Third Air Force, 1 May 1987
 1720th Special Tactics Group (later 720th Special Tactics Group), 1 October 1987
 724th Special Tactics Group, 29 April 2011 – present

Stations
 Hamilton Field, California, 21 October 1941 (aboard the USAT President Garfield, 6–10 December 1941
 Berkeley, California, 7 October 1943 – 31 March 1944
 Pope Air Force Base (later Pope Field), North Carolina, 1 May 1987 – present

Unit Awards

Other
 Air Commando Association 2012 AFSOC Squadron of the Year

Commanders
 July 2003 – July 2005, Lt. Col. Mark F. Stratton
 June 2005 – June 2007, Lt. Col. Robert G. Armfield – Previous 24th STS assignments: Director of Operations (January 1998 – July 2002)
 June 2009 – April 2011, Lt. Col. Matthew Wolfe Davidson – Previous 24th STS assignments: Flight Commander (August 1998 – January 2002), Deputy Commander (June 2008 – June 2009)

See also
 List of United States Air Force special tactics squadrons

References

Citations

General and cited references 
 Attribution

Further reading

External links

 
 24th Special Tactics Squadron at GlobalSecurity.org

Counterterrorist organizations
024
024
United States Joint Special Operations Command